Jared Evan Siegel is an American singer-songwriter, record producer, and rapper. He was signed to Zone 4 under Interscope Records. The song "Frozen", which Evan wrote and produced, appeared on the LeBron James documentary soundtrack entitled Music Inspired by More than a Game. In 2013 his album Boom Bap & Blues with Statik Selektah peaked at No. 8 on the iTunes Soul charts independently.

Early life
Evan grew up in Great Neck, New York. He started out by playing the drums, dreaming to one day become the next Keith Moon. Initially wanting to be a professional drummer, Evan eventually began taking on several other talents. He later became heavily influenced by seminal hip hop artists such as the Wu-Tang Clan, Mos Def, Kool G Rap, and A Tribe Called Quest. He studied early hip hop while also taking musical cues from his alternative and r&b/soul influences such as Thom Yorke, Cream, Bradley Nowell, The Beatles, Stevie Wonder, Al Green, James Brown and others. His early years were troubled and music provided a therapeutic outlet for him.

Later, Evan focused more on producing and songwriting. He started to incorporate raps, while introducing melodic undertones over his own production. In 2008 at the age of 18, Evan won the Brooklyn Hip Hop Festival's Spit 16 competition curated by The Source.

It was around this time where Evan started interning at The FADER in New York City. He gave his then mixtape Radio in My Head to friend and acclaimed Hip Hop director Rik Cordero (whom he met while interning at The FADER). Cordero and Evan started creating visually stunning music videos to complement Evan's sound. These videos were then circulated to the top music executives, and within weeks, Evan had several major label offers.

Career

In June 2009, Evan decided to sign with Zone 4/Interscope with the support of Jimmy Iovine. In October 2009, Evan was featured in Billboard as an "Under the radar artist with the potential to break into the big time."

In August 2010, Interscope released the single, "In Love with You." In March 2011, the song was aired on the Greek television show Radio Arvyla and because of this, it met great success, reaching No. 1 overall on the Greek iTunes charts. During this time, he had also worked with some of his musical heroes such as The Neptunes, Dr. Dre and Mike Elizondo.

In the spring of 2011, Evan joined OneRepublic on a nationwide tour. At the end of 2011, Evan opted out of his contract with Interscope. He split ways with the label expressing that they were not supporting his true vision thoroughly. After leaving and going independent, Evan started to form a passionate cult fan base.

In 2012, Evan released his debut project entitled The 4th Chapter. It was released to fans for free online.
He then helped write and produce a large portion of Hoodie Allen's mixtape Crew Cuts, before releasing his collaboration album with Statik Selektah entitled Boom Bap & Blues on February 26, 2013. It features artists like Joey Badass and Action Bronson, amongst several others. It was originally released as a free album through Evan's website, although days later the album debuted at No. 29 on the iTunes R&B/Soul charts. Within a couple of hours it shot to No. 8. Boom Bap & Blues is said to be some of Evan's best work and has become critically acclaimed.

In 2014, Evan produced a large portion of Hoodie Allen's debut album People Keep Talking. One of the songs, "Numbers," which Evan produced and co-wrote, met great success reaching No. 5 overall on the iTunes charts.

On November 19, 2016, Evan released his first solo full-length album, The Blanket Truth. It peaked at No. 30 on the iTunes pop charts.

In the Spring of 2019, Evan started releasing a slew of new singles. He released the first single "Permanent Damage" in March 2019. He later released another single entitled "Dark Days" in July 2019, a third single "Perfect Strangers" in September 2019 and a fourth single "Sabotage" in December 2019.

Later, in the summer of 2020, Evan released The Art Form of Whatever II, a sequel to his 2015 mixtape The Art Form of Whatever.

In February 2021, Jared announced he would be releasing an album made up entirely of fan collaborations. He named the project COLLAB, and released it on March 19, 2021. In September 2021, Jared announced his album Dark Days, the same name as the title track that was released in 2019. The album was released on October 22, 2021.

On September 6, 2022, Jared announced BB3 - the third sequel to his Boom Bap & Blues album with Statik Selektah. The album was released on October 14, 2022 via Jared's label 4th Chapter Music. While BB3 is considered to be part of the collab-series with Statik Selektah, most of the album was actually produced by Jared himself, as well as with a few other producers.

Musical style
Evan's musical style combines soul, hip-hop, and pop with alternative rock and alternative R&B influences. He is known for an introspective style of songwriting, often citing Bradley Nowell, The Beatles, Radiohead, Method Man, Mos Def, Al Green, Rza, DJ Premier, Stevie Wonder and Cream (band) as his main influences.

Discography

EPs
 Pieces (2013)
 Collab (2021)
Collaborative albums
 Boom Bap & Blues (with Statik Selektah) (2013) 
 Still Blue (with Statik Selektah) (2014)
 BB3 (2022)

Mixtapes
 The Art Form of Whatever (2015)
 The Art Form of Whatever II (2020)

Albums
 The 4th Chapter (2012)
 The Blanket Truth (2016)
 Dark Days (2021)

References

External links

 
 Jared Evan Is Ready To Make Major Noise (Billboard Article)
 Exclusive: Introducing Jared Evan (The Source Interview)
 Urbanian Exclusive: Jared Evan
 With New Mixtape, Jared Evan is Ready to Hit the Big Time

Singer-songwriters from New York (state)
American male singer-songwriters
Living people
1989 births
American hip hop singers
21st-century American singers
21st-century American male singers